Final league standings for the 1912-13 St. Louis Soccer League.

League standings

External links
St. Louis Soccer Leagues (RSSSF)
The Year in American Soccer - 1913

1912-13
1912–13 domestic association football leagues
1912–13 in American soccer
St Louis Soccer
St Louis Soccer